The Naples Plague refers to a plague epidemic in Italy between 1656 and 1658 that nearly eradicated the population of Naples. The epidemic affected mostly central and southern Italy, killing up to 1,250,000 people throughout the Kingdom of Naples according to some estimates. In Naples alone, approximately 150,000–200,000 people died in 1656 due to the plague, accounting for more than half of the population. The epidemic made severe impact on the economic and social structure of Naples as well as some other affected areas.

History

In the 1640s, Spain experienced some serious plague outbreaks, such as Great Plague of Seville, which possibly came from Algiers. The plague spread to Sardinia (possibly from Spain or other European countries) in 1652, arriving in Naples in April 1656, and then spread to most part of southern Italy where the Kingdom of Naples was located. Only Sicily and parts of Calabria and Apulia were not affected.

To the north, the plague reached Rome in June 1656, and then affected most of the Papal State. The plague reached Umbria and Marche, but did not affect the Grand Duchy of Tuscany. It did, however, spread by sea to Liguria.

It came to a stop by forcible quarantine of the poorer districts, and the efforts of Martinus Ludheim, a visiting German physician from Bavaria. Santa Maria del Pianto was built to commemorate it in 1657.

Death toll
It is estimated that the plague may have claimed up to 1,250,000 lives throughout the Kingdom of Naples, making it one of the deadliest epidemics in history. In Naples alone, around 150,000–200,000 people died in 1656, which accounted for at least half of the local population. In Barletta, 7,000–12,000 people died, out of the original 20,000 population.

Outside the Kingdom of Naples, in Rome (capital of the Papal State), around 23,000 people (or 19% of the local population) perished. In Genoa, approximately 60,000 people died due to the epidemic, accounting for 60% of the local population.

See also
 First plague pandemic, including the late 8th century plague of Naples 
 Second plague pandemic (14th-19th century)
 1629–1631 Italian plague
 Third plague pandemic (1855-1960)
List of epidemics

References

External links

17th century in the Kingdom of Naples
Death in Italy
Second plague pandemic
17th-century epidemics